Hemipeplus is a genus of beetles in the family Mycteridae. There are about 16 described species in Hemipeplus.

Species
 Hemipeplus abditus Pollock, 1999
 Hemipeplus angustipennis Pollock, 1999
 Hemipeplus argentinus Pollock, 1999
 Hemipeplus bolivianus Pollock, 1999
 Hemipeplus chaos Thomas, 1985
 Hemipeplus dominicensis Pollock, 1999
 Hemipeplus glabratus Pollock, 1999
 Hemipeplus gounellei Grouvelle, 1896
 Hemipeplus insularis Grouvelle, 1896
 Hemipeplus longiscapus Pollock, 1999
 Hemipeplus marginipennis (LeConte, 1854)
 Hemipeplus mexicanus Grouvelle, 1896
 Hemipeplus microphthalmus (Schwarz, 1878)
 Hemipeplus quadricollis Pollock, 1999
 Hemipeplus thomasi Pollock, 1999
 Hemipeplus tuberculatus Pollock, 1999

References

 Pollock, Darren A. / Arnett, Ross H. Jr., Michael C. Thomas, Paul E. Skelley, and J. H. Frank, eds. (2002). "Family 112. Mycteridae Blanchard 1845". American Beetles, vol. 2: Polyphaga: Scarabaeoidea through Curculionoidea, 530–533.

Further reading

 Arnett, R. H. Jr., M. C. Thomas, P. E. Skelley and J. H. Frank. (eds.). (21 June 2002). American Beetles, Volume II: Polyphaga: Scarabaeoidea through Curculionoidea. CRC Press LLC, Boca Raton, Florida .
 
 Richard E. White. (1983). Peterson Field Guides: Beetles. Houghton Mifflin Company.

External links

 NCBI Taxonomy Browser, Hemipeplus

Tenebrionoidea